Nebojša Maksimović (born 10 December 1965) is a Serbian football manager and former player.

Playing career
Maksimović played for Red Star Belgrade during the 1993–94 First League of FR Yugoslavia, before transferring abroad to South Korean club Ilhwa Chunma. He also played in Greece.

Managerial career
After hanging up his boots, Maksimović served as manager of Serbian SuperLiga clubs Jagodina and Mladi Radnik. He also worked in China.

Honours
Ilhwa Chunma
 K League 1: 1994

References

External links
 
 

1965 births
Living people
Yugoslav footballers
Serbia and Montenegro footballers
Serbian footballers
Association football forwards
Red Star Belgrade footballers
Seongnam FC players
First League of Serbia and Montenegro players
K League 1 players
Serbia and Montenegro expatriate footballers
Expatriate footballers in South Korea
Expatriate footballers in Greece
Serbia and Montenegro expatriate sportspeople in South Korea
Serbia and Montenegro expatriate sportspeople in Greece
Serbia and Montenegro football managers
Serbian football managers
FK Jagodina managers
FK Kolubara managers
Red Star Belgrade non-playing staff
Serbian SuperLiga managers
Serbian expatriate football managers
Expatriate football managers in China
Serbian expatriate sportspeople in China